Bhurch is a village near Kot Ameer Hussain in the district of Gujrat, Pakistan.

References 

Villages in Gujrat District